Athletics at the 2009 Bolivarian Games was held at the Estadio Olímpico Patria in Sucre, Bolivia, between November 22–26, 2009.  A total of 47 events were contested, 24 by men and 23 by women.  In total, 7 games records were set or equaled.  A detailed report on the results was given.

Medal summary

The official webpage is no longer available.

Medal winners below were compiled from a variety of sources.

All results are marked as "affected by altitude" (A), because the stadium in Sucre is situated 2820 m above sea level.

Men

Women

Notes
†: One source lists María Ruiz from Ecuador as bronze medalist in pole vault (without indicating any height or result).  However, other sources say that she did not show or there is no indication for any attempt or height achieved.  Therefore, she was not considered in the medal list.

Medal table (unofficial)

Participation
According to an unofficial count through incomplete result lists, at least 155 athletes from 5 countries participated.

 (at least 27)
 (at least 41)
 (at least 32)
 Perú (at least 16)
 (at least 39)

References

External links
[ Official website] 

Athletics at the Bolivarian Games
International athletics competitions hosted by Bolivia
Bolivarian Games
2009 in Bolivian sport
Athletics